Arenillas de Valderaduey is a locality and minor local entity located in the municipality of Sahagún, in León province, Castile and León, Spain. As of 2020, it has a population of 42.

Geography 
Arenillas de Valderaduey is located 68km southeast of León, Spain.

References

Populated places in the Province of León